Justice Shepherd or Shepard may refer to:

Allan G. Shepherd (c. 1923–1989), associate justice of the Idaho Supreme Court
James E. Shepherd (1847–1910), associate justice and chief justice of the North Carolina Supreme Court
Randall T. Shepard (born 1946), associate justice and chief justice of the Supreme Court of Indiana
Seth Shepard (1847–1917), associate justice and chief justice of the Court of Appeals of the District of Columbia

See also
Judge Shepherd (disambiguation)
Judge Sheppard (disambiguation)